Marcelo Luis Pontiroli (born 22 January 1972 in San Andrés de Giles, Buenos Aires) is a former Argentine footballer who played as a goalkeeper.

Football career 
Pontiroli began his career in 1993 at Deportivo Español, moving to Argentinos Juniors in 1997, and Club Atlético Independiente two years later. Between 2000–07, he represented Belgrano de Córdoba, Club Atlético Lanús and Quilmes Atlético Club, with his first and only abroad experience in between, with only six Primeira Liga games for Varzim S.C. in a relegation-ending season.

In 2007, after 310 Primera División games, 35-year-old Pontiroli returned to Quilmes and helped El Cervecero promote to the top flight in 2009–10. He chose, however, to continue in Primera B Nacional, signing with Deportivo Merlo.

References

External links 
 Marcelo Pontiroli – Argentine League statistics at Fútbol XXI 
 
  

1972 births
Living people
Sportspeople from Buenos Aires Province
Argentine footballers
Association football goalkeepers
Argentine Primera División players
Deportivo Español footballers
Argentinos Juniors footballers
Club Atlético Independiente footballers
Club Atlético Belgrano footballers
Club Atlético Lanús footballers
Quilmes Atlético Club footballers
Deportivo Merlo footballers
Primeira Liga players
Varzim S.C. players
Argentine expatriate footballers
Expatriate footballers in Portugal